Pisania striata is a species of sea snail, a marine gastropod mollusk in the family Pisaniidae.

Description
The length of the shell attains 22.8 mm.

Distribution
This species occurs in the Gulf of Naples, Italy.

References

 Gmelin, J.F. (1791). Vermes. In: Gmelin J.F. (Ed.) Caroli a Linnaei Systema Naturae per Regna Tria Naturae, Ed. 10. Tome 1(6). G.E. Beer, Lipsiae [Leipzig]. pp. 3021-3910
 Gofas, S.; Le Renard, J.; Bouchet, P. (2001). Mollusca. in: Costello, M.J. et al. (eds), European Register of Marine Species: a check-list of the marine species in Europe and a bibliography of guides to their identification. Patrimoines Naturels. 50: 180–213.
 Brunetti M.M. & Della Bella G. (2016). Revisioni di alcuni generi della famiglia Buccinidae Rafinesque, 1815 nel Plio-Pleistocene del Bacino Mediterraneo, con descrizione di tre nuove specie. Bollettino Malacologico. 52: 3-37

External links
 Bivona-Bernardi Ant. (1832 [April]). Caratteri d'un nuovo genere di conchiglie della famiglia delle Columellarie del Signor de Lamarck. Effemeride Scientifiche e Letterarie per la Sicilia. 2(1): 8-13
 Lamarck [J.-B. M.] de. (1822). Histoire naturelle des animaux sans vertèbres. Tome septième. Paris: published by the Author, 711 pp
 Risso A. (1826-1827). Histoire naturelle des principales productions de l'Europe Méridionale et particulièrement de celles des environs de Nice et des Alpes Maritimes. Paris, Levrault
 Scacchi A. (1832). Lettera di Arcangelo Scacchi dottore in medicina su vari testacei napolitani al Sig, D. Carlo Tarentino prof. di storia naturale nel R. Liceo di Catanzaro. Napoli 
 Pallary P. (1900). Coquilles marines du littoral du Départment d'Oran. Journal de Conchyliologie, 48(3): 211-422, pl. 6-8
  Pallary P. (1912). Catalogue des mollusques du littoral méditerranéen de l'Egypte. Mémoires de l'Institut d'Egypte, 7(3): 69-207, pl. 15-18

Pisaniidae
Gastropods described in 1791
Taxa named by Johann Friedrich Gmelin